The Coachella Valley Firebirds are a professional ice hockey expansion team based in Thousand Palms, California, that began play in the 2022–23 American Hockey League (AHL) season. The team is an owned-and-operated affiliate of the Seattle Kraken, which began play during the 2021–22 National Hockey League season. Located in Southern California's Coachella Valley, Acrisure Arena in Thousand Palms is the team's home arena.

History
On December 4, 2018, the NHL Board of Governors voted unanimously to approve Seattle's National Hockey League expansion team, the Seattle Kraken, to begin play in the 2021–22 season. The new ownership group then began making plans for acquiring a minor league affiliate in the American Hockey League (AHL). By early 2019, they had narrowed it down to promoting the ECHL's Idaho Steelheads in Boise, Idaho, or a new expansion team in Palm Springs, California. On June 26, 2019, it was reported the Seattle ownership group had chosen Palm Springs as the site for Seattle's AHL affiliate.  The expansion franchise was approved by the AHL board of governors on September 30, 2019, with plans to begin play in the 2021–22 season.  Delays associated with the construction of an arena in the Palm Springs area caused the team's debut to be pushed back to the 2022–23 season. In the interim Seattle affiliated with the Charlotte Checkers for the 2021–22 season, sharing the team with the Florida Panthers.

On November 5, 2021, the new team revealed its name, the Coachella Valley Firebirds, as well as its logos and colors, at a ceremony held on the construction site of their new arena.

Arena

The home ice for the Firebirds is Acrisure Arena located in Thousand Palms, California, just east of Palm Springs. The Firebirds played four "home" games in the Seattle region in late October 2022 while awaiting the mid-December completion of the new arena: one game at Climate Pledge Arena, the home ice of the parent Seattle Kraken; one game at Angel of the Winds Arena, home of the Everett Silvertips; and two games at the Kraken Community Iceplex, official practice facility of the Kraken. The Firebirds finally stepped on their home ice on December 18, 2022, in which they defeated the Tucson Roadrunners 4-3 in regulation. Cameron Hughes scored the first ever goal at Acrisure Arena, at the 8:49 mark in the 1st period.

Players

Current roster
 March 20, 2023.

References

External links
Official website

 
Ice hockey teams in California